Emmanuel Léonce Kouadio (born 27 December 1998) is a German-Ivorian professional footballer who plays as a right-back for Rot-Weiß Koblenz.

References

External links
 
 
 

1998 births
Living people
Ivorian footballers
German footballers
German people of Ivorian descent
Association football defenders
TSG Sprockhövel players
Wormatia Worms players
SV Waldhof Mannheim players
FC Rot-Weiß Koblenz players
3. Liga players
Regionalliga players
Oberliga (football) players